Pokaran railway station is a major railway station located in Pokaran, Rajasthan. Its code is POK. The railway station is under the administrative control of North Western Railway of Indian Railways. The station consists of two platforms.

References

External links

Railway stations in Jaisalmer district
Pokaran
Jodhpur railway division